The World Water Index (WOWAX) is a global stock market index established in February 2002 by Société Générale in cooperation with SAM Group and Dow Jones Index/STOXX.

It contains the globally largest 20 corporations of the water supply, water infrastructure and water utilities/treatment sector.

The index' assortment of shares is rebalanced every quarter of a year, and revised every six months.

The ISIN of the WOWAX is XY0100291446 and US98151V3006, respectively.

Companies

References

Global stock market indices
Water industry